Adiós, Tierra del Fuego is a 2001 book by the French writer Jean Raspail. It focuses on Tierra del Fuego, an archipelago off the southern tip of South America, in both a historical and personal perspective. The area had been the subject of several previous works by Raspail, in particular related to the subject of Orélie-Antoine de Tounens, the self-proclaimed king of Araucanía and Patagonia, who also is featured prominently in Adiós, Tierra del Fuego. The book received the Jean Giono Prize.

Reception
Philippe Brassart of La Dépêche du Midi wrote: "Adios Tierra del Fuego is neither a novel, nor an essay, further not a banal travelogue, it is a tribute." Brassart described the book's language as "rich and pure".

References

External links
 Adiós, Tierra del Fuego at the publisher's website 
 Adiós, Tierra del Fuego at the author's website 

2001 non-fiction books
French travel books
French-language books
Tierra del Fuego
Works by Jean Raspail